Dasna is a town, near Ghaziabad city and a nagar panchayat in Ghaziabad district  in the state of Uttar Pradesh, India.

Geography
It has an average elevation of 207 metres (679 feet). There are other prominent landmarks situated near Dasna like Dasna jail, Delhi Meerut Expressway, Eastern Peripheral Expressway.

Demographics
 India census, Dasna had a population of 34,914. Males constitute 54% of the population and females 46%. Dasna has an average literacy rate of 66.98%, lower than the state average of 67.68%: male literacy rate is 76.46% and female literacy is 56.51%. In Dasna, 22% of the population is under 6 years of age.

Religion

References

Cities and towns in Ghaziabad district, India
New Religion % in Dasna
Islam - 94%
Hindusism - 6%
Dasna Guest Posting Site